Sapang, Sabah, is 4° 37' 58" north of the equator and 118° 19' 58" east of the prime meridian.

Populated places in Sabah